Alan Frederick Gofton (born 4 October 1979) is an English former cricketer.  Gofton was a right-handed batsman who bowled right-arm medium pace.  He was born at Chesterfield, Derbyshire.

Gofton made his first-class debut for Oxford University against Nottinghamshire in 2000.  From 1999 to 2002, he represented the University in 13 first-class matches, the last of which came against Gloucestershire.  In his 13 first-class matches he scored 281 runs at a batting average of 17.56, with a high score of 47*.  With the ball he took 11 wickets at a bowling average of 73.36, with best figures of 3/41.

Gofton represented the Derbyshire Cricket Board in a single List A match against Derbyshire in the 2000 NatWest Trophy.  In only List A match, he scored 17 runs and with the ball he took 2 wickets for 76 runs.

References

External links
Alan Gofton at Cricinfo
Alan Gofton at CricketArchive

1979 births
Living people
Cricketers from Chesterfield, Derbyshire
English cricketers
Oxford University cricketers
Derbyshire Cricket Board cricketers
Alumni of Wadham College, Oxford
Oxford MCCU cricketers
Oxford Universities cricketers